Tanzania's film industry, also known as Swahiliwood or Bongo movie (a portmanteau of Swahili, Tanzania's official language, and Hollywood) and Bongowood, was established around 2001.

Films produced with low budgets, short schedules and camcorders are referred to colloquially as "bongo films" and are mass-released in DVD format. In 2011, bongo films were produced on a regular basis, but only a few higher quality Tanzanian feature films have been released in cinemas.

Most Tanzanian film production studios are based in Dar es Salaam.

Before Tanzania's independence in 1961, some foreign movies were filmed in Tanganyika and Zanzibar.  The Zanzibar International Film Festival hosts films, workshops, exhibitions, Dhow races, music and performing arts, as well as panoramas of women, children and villages. The company movies are Steps Intertainment & Mzimuni Theatre Art

History 
Tanzanians inherited parts of their cinematic culture from British colonialists, including the production of both commercial films and government-funded instructional films. After independence, the newly formed government led by the President Julius Kambarage Nyerere sent home South African film expats, and established the country's own film industry under the Ministry of Community Development. South Africa was plagued by apartheid, and Tanzania and other independent African countries broke ties with them until it ended. Replacing the South African filmmakers were Yugoslavian filmmakers, who started aiding the film industry of Tanzania in 1963, helping establish the industry. Many of the films created during this time were instructional or educational, made by the government, and distributed across Tanzania.

Tanzanian films 
In 2001, Maangamizi: The Ancient One was the first and up to now the last submission of Film from Tanzania for the Academy Awards category Best Foreign Film. Mapenzi Ya Mungu (God's Love) was released in 2014 Tanzanian movies list. Bongoland, a film about a US immigrant from Tanzania, was released in 2003. Other notable films include Ni Noma, released in June 2016. Other movies were from Mzimuni Theatre Arts which are Misukosuko release in [2010], Double J (Double Jimmy) in [2013], Part Of Job [2011] & Inspector Seba [2008].

Well known artists include Steven Kanumba, Elizabeth Michael, Kajala Masanja, Mzee Chillo, Baby Madaha, Wema Sepetu, Vincent Kigosi, Lucy Komba, Jimmy Mponda [J Plus], Sebastian Mwanangulo [Seba], & Charles Magari.

Foreign films 
Many foreign films were shot in and around Tanzania prior to independence, including adventure, romance and war movies.

Eight months of footage were required for the U.S. film Men of Two Worlds at Tanganyika in 1943. John Wayne's movie Hatari! was shot in Tanzania. Nature documentaries have been filmed in Tanzania, including a few parts of Impressionen unter Wasser and The Crimson Wing: Mystery of the Flamingos. In 1992, Dutch documentary Isingiro Hospital was made about a hospital in Tanzania treating AIDS patients. In 2010, filmmaker Nick Broomfield produced the documentary Albino United, about an albino football team in Tanzania in 2010, and filmed an adaption of the Ronan Bennett's novel The Catastrophist in the city of Mwanza.

References

External links 

 imDb's list of "Tanzania in movies" list